The Yellowknife River is a river in the Northwest Territories, Canada. It flows south and empties into Yellowknife Bay, part of Great Slave Lake, at the city of Yellowknife. The lake is drained by the Mackenzie River into the Arctic Ocean as part of the largest drainage basin in Canada.  The name of the river derives from the Yellowknives Dene, a First Nations people who have lived in the area for thousands of years.

The city of Yellowknife draws its water supply from the river.

See also
List of rivers of the Northwest Territories

References

Rivers of the Northwest Territories